Limnocyonidae ("swamp dogs") is a family of extinct predatory mammals from extinct order Hyaenodonta. Fossil remains of these mammals are known from late Paleocene to late Eocene deposits in North America and Asia. Limnocyonids had only two molars in the upper and lower dentition.

Classification and phylogeny

Taxonomy
 Family: †Limnocyonidae 
 Genus: †Iridodon 
 †Iridodon datzae 
 Genus: †Limnocyon (paraphyletic genus) 
 †Limnocyon cuspidens 
 †Limnocyon potens 
 †Limnocyon verus 
 Genus: †Oxyaenodon 
 †Oxyaenodon dysodus 
 Genus: †Prolaena 
 †Prolaena parva 
 Genus: †Prolimnocyon (paraphyletic genus) 
 †Prolimnocyon antiquus 
 †Prolimnocyon atavus 
 †Prolimnocyon chowi 
 †Prolimnocyon eerius 
 †Prolimnocyon haematus 
 Genus: †Thinocyon 
 †Thinocyon medius 
 †Thinocyon velox 
 Incertae sedis:
 †"Thinocyon" sichowensis

Phylogeny 
The phylogenetic relationships of family Limnocyonidae are shown in the following cladogram:

See also
 Mammal classification
 Hyaenodonta

References

Hyaenodonts
Paleogene mammals of North America
Paleogene mammals of Asia
Prehistoric mammal families